Əli Bayramlı (also, Äli Bayramly and Ali-Bayramly) is a village in the Qazakh Rayon of Azerbaijan.

References 

Populated places in Qazax District